2022 Winter Olympics marketing was a long running campaign that began since Beijing won its bid to host the games in 2015.

Symbols

Emblem
The official emblem "Winter Dream" was unveiled on 15 December 2017 at the Beijing National Aquatics Center. The emblem is a stylized rendition of the character "冬" (Winter) inspired by winter snow, with a ribbon motif. The top is meant to resemble a skier and the bottom is meant to resemble a skater. The emblem also features the Olympic colors (except black) and the Chinese flag colors. The emblem was designed by Lin Cunzhen who also created the  Nanjing 2014 logo.

Slogan
The Games' promotional slogan is Joyful Rendezvous Upon Pure Ice and Snow, which was used for the candidature process for Beijing to bid for the 2022 Games. On September 17, 2021 the Beijing 2022 announce the slogan of Olympic Winter Games  "Together for a Shared Future!". A song with the same name, "Together for a Shared Future" was sung in two versions: one by Jackson Yee, the other by William Chan and Tia Ray; to promote the slogan of the Winter Olympics and Paralympics.

Mascot

The mascot "Bing Dwen Dwen" was unveiled on 17 September 2019  at the Shougang Ice Hockey Arena and was designed by Cao Xue.
The giant panda, is often regarded as one main symbols of China. Its helmet is also indicative of the snow and ice of winter sports. Along with the Olympic mascot, the Paralympic mascot was also revealed on the same day.

Corporate sponsorship

See also 

 2010 Winter Olympics marketing
 2014 Winter Olympics marketing
 2018 Winter Olympics marketing

References

Marketing
Olympic marketing